Symphony in E-flat is a ballet made by John Clifford to Stravinsky's Symphony in E-flat, Op. 1 (1908). The premiere took place as part of New York City Ballet's Stravinsky Festival, June 20, 1972, at the New York State Theater, Lincoln Center.

Original cast 
Gelsey Kirkland
Peter Martins

New York City Ballet repertory
Ballets by John Clifford
Symphony in E-flat (Stravinsky)
1972 ballet premieres
New York City Ballet Stravinsky Festival